The Protectorate of the Western Regions was an imperial administration (a protectorate) situated in the Western Regions administered by Han dynasty China and its successors on and off from 59 or 60 BCE until the end of the Sixteen Kingdoms period in 439. The "Western Regions" refers to areas west of Yumen Pass, especially the Tarim Basin in southern Xinjiang. These areas would later be termed Altishahr (southern Xinjiang, excluding Dzungaria) by Turkic-speaking peoples. The term "western regions" was also used by the Chinese more generally to refer to Central Asia. 

The protectorate was the first direct rule by a Chinese government of the area. It consisted of various vassal states and Han garrisons placed under the authority of a Protector-General of the Western Regions, who was appointed by the Han court.

History 

During the Han–Xiongnu War, the Chinese empire established a military garrison at Wulei (near present-day Cedaya 策达雅, in Bugur/Luntai County). The Chinese sought to control the Western Regions in order to keep the Xiongnu away from Inner China, and to control the valuable Silk Road trade that passed through the area. The local inhabitants of the Western Regions were diverse, and the area contained several groups who originated in Western Eurasia and/or spoke Indo-European languages. These groups included Tocharian-speaking city-states like Ārśi (Arshi; later Agni/Karasahr), Kuča (Kucha), Gumo (later Aksu), Turfan (Turpan), and Loulan (Krorän/Korla). Additionally, residents of the oasis city-states of Khotan and Kashgar spoke Saka, one of the Eastern Iranian languages.

The position of Protector-General was officially established in 59 or 60 BCE after the Southern Xiongnu ruler Bi, the Rizhu King of the Right, submitted to the Han dynasty. It was the highest Han dynasty military position in the west during its existence. During the peak of the Protectorate's power in 51 BCE, the Wusun nation was brought under Han submission. The post was abandoned after the usurpation of Wang Mang (Xin dynasty) from 8-22 CE. By then, at least 18 different people had served as protector-general, though only 10 of them have known names. In 45 CE, the eighteen states of the Western Regions requested the re-establishment of the Protectorate to restore peace to the region, but Emperor Guangwu of Han refused.

During the second half of the first century CE, at the time of the Eastern Han dynasty, Chinese armies led by Ban Chao, Dou Gu, and Guo Xun brought the Western Regions back under Han control. The Protectorate was thus re-established. In 74 CE, Emperor Ming of Han and his successor awarded the position of Protector-General (now with administrative obligations as well) to general Chen Mu. In 83 CE, the office of Chief Official of the Western Regions was established and awarded to Ban Chao. The position of the Chief Official was beneath that of the Protector-General. Ban Chao would later be made Protector-General in 91 CE, after which he reconquered the Western Regions. The seat of the Protectorate was for a time shifted to Taqian (or Tagan; near modern Kucha). Ban Chao was succeeded by Ren Shang and Duan Xi.

On 29 July 107, a series of Qiang uprisings in the areas of Hexi Corridor and Guanzhong. Duan Xi was killed and the post was abandoned. The Protectorate was later restored from 123-124 by the son of Ban Chao, Ban Yong. The Protectorate was again revived in 335 by Former Liang and headquartered in Gaochang until the demise of Northern Liang. 

In the southern Tarim Basin, coins from the period of the Protectorate's existence have been found with inscriptions in both Chinese and the Kharoshthi script, which was used for local Indo-European languages.

In the 7th century, a successor administration, the Protectorate General to Pacify the West was established by the Tang Dynasty at Xizhou (Turpan) and was later moved to Kucha.

Thirty-six city states

List of Protectors-General

Western Han and Xin 
 Zheng Ji 60－48 BCE
 Han Xuan (韓宣) 48－45 BCE
 Unknown (3rd) 45－42 BCE
 Unknown (4th) 42－39 BCE
 Unknown (5th) 39－36 BCE
 Gan Yanshou (甘延壽) 36－33 BCE
 Duan Huizong (段會宗) 33－30, 21－18 BCE
 Lian Bao (廉褒) 30－27 BCE
 Unknown (9th) 27－24 BCE
 Han Li (韓立) 24－21 BCE
 Unknown (11th) 18－15 BCE
 Guo Shun (郭舜) 15－12 BCE
 Sun Jian (孫建) 12－9 BCE
 Unknown (14th) 9－6 BCE
 Unknown (15th) 6－3 BCE
 Unknown (16th) 3 BCE－1 CE
 Dan Qin (但欽) 1－13 CE
 Li Chong 13－23 CE

Eastern Han 
 Chen Mu 74－75
 Ban Chao 91－102
 Ren Shang 102－106
 Duan Xi 106－107

Maps

See also 

 Chief Official of the Western Regions
 Han–Xiongnu War
 War of the Heavenly Horses
 Sogdia
 Tang dynasty in Inner Asia
 Protectorate General to Pacify the West
 Beiting Protectorate

References

Bibliography

External links 
 Ma, Yong. "Xiyu Duhu" ("Protector General of the Western Regions"). Encyclopedia of China (Chinese History Edition), 1st ed.
 The Grand Game in Afghanistan
 Maps of Xinjiang

Administrative divisions of ancient China
Han dynasty
History of Xinjiang
Former protectorates
Chinese Central Asia